Discouraged Ones (stylized discøuraged ønes) is the third full-length album by Katatonia, released on 27 April 1998. This is the only Katatonia album with bassist Micke Oretoft. It is also their last release with Jonas Renkse on drums; on future releases, he was the band's lead vocalist and contributed additional guitar work. According to Renkse, Discouraged Ones had sold roughly 20,000 copies as of 2001.

Track listing

Release history

Personnel

Katatonia 
 Jonas Renkse – drums, guitars, lead vocals
 Anders Nyström – guitars, keyboards, backing vocals
 Fred Norrman – guitars
 Micke Oretoft – bass

Additional personnel 
Mikael Åkerfeldt – backing vocals, vocal production
Tomas Skogsberg – engineering, mixing
Fred Estby – engineering
Pressens Bild – photography
Tom Martinsen – photography, digital design
Maria Winsnes – photography
David Castillo – remastering
reesycle.com – layout

References 

Katatonia albums
1998 albums
Avantgarde Music albums